Margaret Kathleen Regan (September 14, 1919 – April 10, 1980), better known as Kay Medford, was an American actress. For her performance as Rose Brice in the musical Funny Girl and the film adaptation of the same name, she was nominated for a Tony Award for Best Featured Actress in a Musical and an Academy Award for Best Supporting Actress respectively.

Early years
Medford was born in 1919. Her mother had been an actress with a Shakespearean stock group in Connecticut. She was orphaned in her teens. She adopted the name Kay Medford professionally, and began her career after graduating from high school and working as a nightclub waitress.

Career 
Medford began entertaining professionally by performing at summer resorts in the Catskill Mountains. In 1949, she toured with a nightclub routine in which she did impersonations of Hollywood celebrities.

Medford was the original Mae Peterson (Albert's mother) in Bye Bye Birdie on Broadway, garnering excellent reviews. Medford appeared in the Warner Bros. rock and roll film, Jamboree (1957). She made her Broadway debut in 1951 in the musical Paint Your Wagon.

She was cast in Carousel, then appeared onstage in Funny Girl as the mother of Fanny Brice (played by Barbra Streisand); for this performance she was nominated for a 1964 Tony Award for Featured Actress (Musical), and when she repeated the role in the 1968 film adaptation, she was nominated for an Academy Award for Best Supporting Actress.

Her many film credits included roles in A Face in the Crowd (1957), The Rat Race (1960), BUtterfield 8 (1960), Girl of the Night (1960), Ensign Pulver (1964), A Fine Madness (1966), The Busy Body (1967), Angel in My Pocket (1969), Twinky (1969), But I Don't Want to Get Married! (1970), Fire Sale (1977), and Windows (1980). 

On television, Medford portrayed Harriet Endicott on To Rome with Love, Gloria's mother on That's Life, and Maria's mother on On Our Own, and was a member of the cast of The Dean Martin Show. She also guest-starred on series, including Decoy, Marcus Welby, M.D.,The Partridge Family, and Barney Miller.

Death
Medford never married and had no children. She died of cancer in New York City in 1980, aged 60.

Partial filmography

References

External links
 
 

 Genealogy profile #2, familysearch.org; accessed November 20, 2014.

1919 births
1980 deaths
American film actresses
American musical theatre actresses
American stage actresses
American television actresses
American people of Irish descent
Actresses from New York City
Deaths from cancer in New York (state)
20th-century American actresses